Custines is a commune in the Meurthe-et-Moselle department in north-eastern France.

History
The town was called Condé until 1719.

See also
 Communes of the Meurthe-et-Moselle department

References

Communes of Meurthe-et-Moselle